Kuckuck Schallplatten (engl.: Cuckoo Records) is a German record label founded in August 1969 by Eckart Rahn, Mal Sondock and the advertising agency ConceptData  in Munich, growing out of his music publishing company 
E.R.P. Musikverlag which was founded on April 1, 1968. It was distributed by Deutsche Grammophon (Polydor). It is the first German progressive rock-label. It is now the longest-surviving independent label in Germany. Most of its recordings have been reissued on CD, and all are now available as downloads.

Artists
Antiteater (Peer Raben and filmmaker Rainer Werner Fassbinder)
Armageddon
Murphy Blend
CWT
Deuter
Out of Focus
Jack Grunsky
Peter Michael Hamel
Hanuman
Sonny Hennig
Ihre Kinder
Hans Otte 
Terry Riley
Eberhard Schoener 
Ernst Schultz 
Lied des Teufels 
Keith West  
Sam Spence

Some early releases by Kitaro were licensed to the label through Pony Canyon, Inc. of Tokyo, Japan.

See also
 List of record labels

External links
 Celestial Harmonies (Eckart Rahn)

IFPI members
German record labels
Record labels established in 1969
Experimental music record labels
Rock record labels
Krautrock